José Tadeu Mouro Júnior  or simply  Tadeu  (born April 1, 1986 in Araraquara) is a forward who plays for Pelotas.

Career
Tadeu played for Cruzeiro Esporte Clube São Paulo, Juventude, Grêmio, Figueirense and Sport Recife.

Bursaspor
On 27 January 2009, Tadeu signed a three-year contract with Turkish club Bursaspor.

Persepolis
Tadeu signed a two-year contract with Iranian giant, Persepolis on 28 December 2014 after success in medical tests. He was transferred to the Red Army on 1 January 2015.

Later career
In September 2018, Tadeu moved to Italy and joined A.C. Mestre. However, his contract was terminated three months later. Tadeu then returned to Brazil and played for Rio Claro. In December 2019, Tadeu signed for Caldense. However, he was released already in the beginning of January 2020 because he didn't fit in the club's philosophy. A few days later, he then joined Esporte Clube Pelotas.

Career statistics

References

External links
 Player profile Bursaspor.org
 Photo
 

1986 births
Living people
People from Araraquara
Brazilian footballers
Brazilian expatriate footballers
Campeonato Brasileiro Série A players
Campeonato Brasileiro Série B players
Campeonato Brasileiro Série D players
Süper Lig players
Persian Gulf Pro League players
São Paulo FC players
Esporte Clube Juventude players
Grêmio Foot-Ball Porto Alegrense players
Sociedade Esportiva Palmeiras players
Figueirense FC players
Sport Club do Recife players
Grêmio Barueri Futebol players
Associação Desportiva Recreativa e Cultural Icasa players
Ceará Sporting Club players
Clube Náutico Capibaribe players
Bursaspor footballers
Persepolis F.C. players
Boa Esporte Clube players
Penang F.C. players
América Futebol Clube (RN) players
Rio Claro Futebol Clube players
Associação Atlética Caldense players
Esporte Clube Pelotas players
Brazilian expatriate sportspeople in Turkey
Brazilian expatriate sportspeople in Iran
Brazilian expatriate sportspeople in Malaysia
Brazilian expatriate sportspeople in Italy
Expatriate footballers in Turkey
Expatriate footballers in Iran
Expatriate footballers in Malaysia
Expatriate footballers in Italy
Association football forwards
Footballers from São Paulo (state)